Mon petit doigt m'a dit... is a 2005 French comedy mystery film based on the 1968 novel By the Pricking of My Thumbs by Agatha Christie. It was directed by Pascal Thomas and stars Catherine Frot and André Dussollier.

Cast
 Catherine Frot - Prudence Beresford
 André Dussollier - Bélisaire Beresford
 Geneviève Bujold - Rose Evangelista
 Laurent Terzieff - Sévigné
 Valérie Kaprisky - Miss Blayes
 Anne Le Ny - Alice Perry
 Bernard Verley - The General
 Alexandra Stewart - Madame Boscovan
 Sarah Biasini - Marie-Christine
 François Bettens - Rudi

References

External links
 

2005 films
2005 comedy films
2000s French-language films
Films directed by Pascal Thomas
Films based on British novels
Films based on works by Agatha Christie
French comedy films
Tommy and Tuppence
2000s French films